Fredrick "Fritz" Kaegi is an American politician who has served as Cook County assessor since 2018.

Early life
Kaegi was born in November 1971 in Chicago. He grew up in the Hyde Park neighborhood of Chicago.

He graduated from Haverford College, and went on to get his Master of Business Administration from Stanford University.

Career
For more than twenty years, Kaegi worked as a asset manager. This included 13 years spent working at Columbia Wagner Asset Management.

Kaegi holds the designations of Chartered Financial Analyst and Certified Illinois Assessment Officer. He also is a member of the International Association of Assessing Officers.

Cook County Assessor

2018 campaign
A first-time candidate for public office, Kaegi ran for Cook County assessor in 2018. He largely self-financed his campaign. Kaegi's ran as a reformer under the slogan, "No favoritism, just fairness". In the Democratic primary, he defeated embattled incumbent Joseph Berrios. Kaegi originally had appeared to have successfully challenged the ballot petitions of Andrea Raila, kicking her out of the race, thus making the primary a one-on-one race between Kaegi and Berrios. However, Raila was still appeared on ballots, as they had already been printed, but no votes were cast for her would be counted. However, after a lawsuit, judges made it so that Raila would be allowed to run, making it a three-person race again. Berrios was the powerful chairman of the Cook County Democratic Party. During the primary election, Kaegi received the endorsements of the Chicago Sun-Times, Chicago Tribune, Daily Herald, as well as politicians such as Danny Davis, Bill Foster, Robin Kelly, Mike Quigley, Bobby Rush, and Jan Schakowsky. The Chicago Tribune described his victory against Berrios as a "rare topping of the machine". After defeating Berrios to be the Democratic nominee, Kaegi won the general election against Republican Joseph Paglia.

Tenure
As assessor, Kaegi began the process of reassessing all of the county's properties, to be done over a three-year period. Kaegi reassessments have been seen as shifting the tax burden from residential to commercial properties. His predecessor, Berrios, had undervalued many commercial properties. Kaegi has received pushback from localities for the increased value assessments he has given to many commercial properties, as localities worry that if commercial property owners successfully appeal to the Cook County Board of Review, there is a risk that local tax bodies will need to give tax refunds to the ownership properties in question.

Amid the COVID-19 pandemic, Kaegi moved to reduce the tax burden on most commercial and residential properties, to account for the pandemic's impact.

Personal life
Kaegi lives in Oak Park, Illinois. He and his wife, Rebecca, have three children.

Electoral history

References

1971 births
Cook County Assessors
Haverford College alumni
Illinois Democrats
Living people
People from Oak Park, Illinois
Politicians from Chicago
Stanford Graduate School of Business alumni
CFA charterholders